Ogham is a Unicode block containing characters for representing Primitive Irish language inscriptions as codified in the Ogham script.

History
The following Unicode-related documents record the purpose and process of defining specific characters in the Ogham block:

See also 
 I.S. 434

References 

Unicode blocks
Ogham